Needmore is an unincorporated community in Jackson Township, Brown County, in the U.S. state of Indiana.

History
A post office was established at Needmore in 1872, and remained in operation until it was discontinued in 1919. Tradition has it when an early visitor to the settlement remarked that it "needed more", the name stuck.

In 1884, Needmore contained a blacksmith, several stores, and a population of approximately 100 inhabitants.

Geography

References

Unincorporated communities in Brown County, Indiana
Unincorporated communities in Indiana